Chermak is a surname. Notable people with the surname include: 

Cy Chermak (1929–2021), American producer and screenwriter
Frank Chermak (1893–?), American politician